The Milk Lake is a lake in Shilin District, Taipei, Taiwan. The lake is part of Yangmingshan National Park.

Geology
The lake turns white due to the sulfurous fumes vented from the lake bed which turns the water milky white. After gradually precipitating, the sulfur forms whitish-yellow or pale grey layers on the lake bed.

Transportation
The lake is accessible by bus from Shilin Station of Taipei Metro.

See also
 Geography of Taiwan
 List of lakes of Taiwan

References

Lakes of Taipei